Gregory Bruce Jarvis (August 24, 1944 – January 28, 1986) was an American engineer and astronaut who died during the destruction of the Space Shuttle Challenger on mission STS-51-L, where he was serving as payload specialist for Hughes Aircraft.

Education
Jarvis graduated from Mohawk Central High School (later renamed to Gregory B. Jarvis High School, which eventually became the Gregory B. Jarvis Middle School in his honor), in Mohawk, New York, in 1962. He received a Bachelor of Science degree in electrical engineering from the State University of New York at Buffalo in 1967, and a Master of Science degree in the same discipline from Northeastern University in 1969. Jarvis joined the United States Air Force the same year and served until 1973, when he was honorably discharged as a Captain. Thereafter he worked for Hughes Aircraft.

Space Shuttle Challenger disaster
In June 1984, Jarvis was one of two Hughes Aircraft employees selected as candidates for the Space Shuttle program. He planned to conduct experiments regarding the effects of weightlessness on fluids. Jarvis was originally scheduled to make his shuttle flight in April 1985, but his spot on that flight was replaced by U.S. senator Jake Garn. His flight was rescheduled for early January 1986, but he was again replaced – this time by U.S. representative Bill Nelson.

Jarvis was payload specialist 2 on STS-51-L which was launched from the Kennedy Space Center, Florida, at 11:38:00 EST on January 28, 1986. The crew on board the Orbiter Challenger included Commander Dick Scobee, pilot Michael J. Smith (USN), mission specialists Dr. Ronald McNair, Lt. Col. Ellison Onizuka (USAF), Dr. Judith Resnik, and fellow civilian payload specialist Christa McAuliffe. The entire STS-51-L crew died on January 28, 1986, when Challenger broke up during launch.

The remains of all seven astronauts from the Challenger disaster were discovered in the crew decks on the ocean floor. Jarvis' body was discovered in the lower mid-deck along with McNair and McAuliffe. During salvage operations to raise the crew deck from the ocean floor, his body escaped from the wreckage, floated to the surface, and disappeared back into the sea. On April 15, 1986, on the last scheduled attempt to recover wreckage, it was rediscovered and returned to shore. Jarvis was cremated and his ashes scattered in the Pacific Ocean.

Awards and honors

The East Engineering building on University at Buffalo (SUNY) north campus was renamed Jarvis Hall after Gregory Jarvis' death. In Spring of 1986, when the university had not yet named the building in his memory, four students scaled the building and nailed a sign with the name "Jarvis Hall" onto the side of the building as a show of support for the deceased astronaut. In 1987, the name was made official with a dedication ceremony. Jarvis Hall is devoted largely to Aerospace Engineering and engineering support services.

Mohawk Central High School in Mohawk, NY was renamed Gregory B. Jarvis Jr/Sr High School. It is now the Gregory B. Jarvis Middle School of the Central Valley Central School District.

A sculpture by SUNY at Buffalo faculty member emeritus Tony Paterson entitled "Jarvis Memorial" was commissioned by SUNY at Buffalo to honor Jarvis, and is currently in the SUNY at Buffalo art collection.

Jarvis was portrayed by Richard Jenkins  in the 1990 TV movie Challenger.

In 2004, Jarvis was posthumously awarded the Congressional Space Medal of Honor.

The hydropower-producing dam on Hinckley Lake, NY, operated by the New York Power Authority, is named the Gregory B. Jarvis Dam.

See also
 List of human spaceflights
 List of Space Shuttle missions
 List of Space Shuttle crews

References

External links
 Official NASA Bio
 Memorial to Greg Jarvis in Hermosa Beach, California at the Sites of Memory webpage
 Jarvis Memorial sculpture at Jarvis Hall on University at Buffalo north campus
 New York Power Authority names hydroelectric power plant near Jarvis' hometown the "Gregory B. Jarvis Power Project"
 Jarvis Hall on University at Buffalo north campus
 Interview with Marcia Jarvis: ''Looking back: Greg Jarvis' dream remembered
  (cenotaph)

1944 births
1986 deaths
Accidental deaths in Florida
American astronauts
Military personnel from Detroit
Military personnel from Utica, New York
University at Buffalo alumni
Northeastern University alumni
United States Air Force officers
American electrical engineers
Space Shuttle program astronauts
Space Shuttle Challenger disaster
Space Shuttle Challenger disaster victims
Recipients of the Congressional Space Medal of Honor
NASA sponsored astronauts
Raytheon Company people